Roland Garros Airport , formerly known as Gillot Airport, is located in Sainte-Marie on Réunion, France.

Overview

Roland Garros Airport is the hub of Air Austral and served 2,293,042 passengers in 2017 (8.8% more than in 2016). Air Austral also has its head office on the airport property. When Air Bourbon existed until 2004, its head office also was on the airport property.

It is notable for operating the world's three longest domestic flight routes; to Paris (CDG and Orly) and to Marseille.

Statistics

Airlines and destinations

Ground transport
It was once planned to construct a Réunion Tram Train to link the airport to the capital Saint-Denis and Saint-Paul, but plans for the construction were abandoned in 2013.

See also
 Pierrefonds Airport

References

External links 

 Reunion Island Airport Roland Garros (official site) 
 Reunion Island Airport Roland Garros (official site) 
 Aéroport de La Réunion Roland Garros (Union des Aéroports Français) 
 

Buildings and structures in Réunion
Airports in Réunion